An output signal switching device (or OSSD) is an electronic device used as part of the safety system of a machine. It provides a coded signal which, when interrupted due to a safety event, signals the machine to shut down. It works by converting the standard direct current supply, usually 24 volts, into two pulsed and out-of-phase signals. The benefit of this is to avoid the possibility of a stray signal keeping the machine operating while actually in an unsafe condition.

Technical description
The device usually acts as the interface of a sensor (such as a light curtain), designed to signal a safety-related event, typically when the light curtain beams being "broken". OSSD signals are the outputs from the protective device (light curtain or scanner) to a safety relay. OSSD outputs are typically semiconductor or transistor outputs, as opposed to relay or contact type outputs. There are usually two independent channels, so-called OSSD1 and OSSD2.

The non-tripped state is typically 24 VDC, and the tripped state (when the safety barrier has been violated) 0 VDC. If a wire were to break between the light curtain and the safety relay, the safety relay would trip to the safe state.

The OSSD outputs are self-checked. In the non-tripped state, the outputs periodically pulse low. The protective device checks the output, to make sure it does indeed go low when commanded. If not, the output may have failed or has shorted to 24V somewhere else. Between OSSD1 and OSSD2 the pulse intervals are staggered to check for criss-crossed wiring between the two.

The technology relies on two independent channels carrying the same information output by the device:

 Idle signal is 24 V, periodically shortly pulsed to 0 V (pulses are not synchronous) in order for the receiver to ensure no shortcut to either 0 V or 24 V.
 Active signal is issued when both lines present 0 V; a single line presenting 0 V for a duration longer than the test pulses is sufficient to signal an event.

Some related terms:
 Electrosensitive protective equipment (ESPE) - a device such as a light curtain, safety scanner, or gate position sensor. The ESPE has OSSD outputs.
 External Device Monitor (EDM). The device issuing the OSSD signals may have an EDM input. The EDM is used to verify that the controlled device (safety relay) did indeed open when the OSSD signals were dropped. The safety relay has normally closed contacts, which close when the relay is de-energized, thereby turning on the EDM input.

See also 
 Automation
 Safety engineering

References 

 European patent EP 2 362 408 B1 accorded to Rockwell Automation Germany GmbH & Co. KG, with chronograms and examples.
 Article from the review Instrumentation and Control (South Africa) explaining use cases.

Safety engineering
Industrial automation